Lake Tatawai was a tidal freshwater lake located immediately north of Lake Waipori in Otago, in New Zealand's South Island.

It is one of the historical lakes that was drained soon after European Settlement of the Taieri Plains. Lake Tatawai drained into Lake Waipori by a small channel, and ultimately into the Taieri. It was a very shallow lake and would have originally been surrounded by wetlands.

Notes

Lakes of Otago
Former lakes of Oceania